PP3 is free software that produces sky charts, focussing on high quality graphics and typography. It is distributed a license based on the MIT License, but with this restriction added:

Sky charts are produced as LaTeX files, so an installation of LaTeX and Ghostscript is required to obtain results in PostScript or PDF formats. Knowledge of command line syntax for these packages is however not required, as PP3 can run the conversions automatically.

Initially Wikipedia's own star charts were produced by PP3. PP3 generates maps in the azimuthal equidistant projection.

See also 

Space flight simulation game
List of space flight simulation games
Planetarium software
List of observatory software

References

External links

 Official website
 

Free astronomy software
Science software for Windows
Free software programmed in C++